or Puppet Entertainment Sherlock Holmes is a Japanese puppetry television series written by Kōki Mitani and produced and broadcast by NHK. The puppets for the series were designed by Bunta Inoue.  The first series of 18 episodes was broadcast on Sundays from 12 October 2014 to 15 February 2015 by NHK Educational TV (ETV); the first six episodes were broadcast by NHK General TV (GTV) in March and August 2014. A special programme was broadcast on 5 October 2014 while a "Sherlock Holmes Award" was broadcast on 28 December 2014. Each episode was rebroadcast on successive Fridays. The programme won the Japan Sherlock Holmes Award on 22 March 2015.

The series is based on the Canon of Sherlock Holmes, with characters and events adapted to a fictional London boarding school where a teenage Sherlock Holmes (voiced by Kōichi Yamadera) investigates incidents with roommate John H. Watson (voiced by Wataru Takagi).  There are no murders, and characters appear where they were not present in the original stories.

Some episodes are being rebroadcast from 22 February 2015. The production of new episodes was announced on the official website of the programme and on website "Sherlock Gakuen". Staff member Kunio Yoshikawa said that production and broadcast of an English version are scheduled. On 1 June 2015, NHK announced that a new series of the programme, called Holmes and Watson Mystery - (No heya :  a room of mystery) would be broadcast on Thursdays' from July to September 2015. The series featured John H. Watson commenting on the deductions of Holmes. Some episodes from the first series were also broadcast.

Premise and character adaptations
John H. Watson, a boy who transfers from Australia to a fictional London boarding school called Beeton School, becomes the roommate of Sherlock Holmes. Although Holmes has a reputation as a trouble-maker, he has keen powers of observation and the two are able to solve the many incidents which occur at the school, at the request of teachers and pupils.

The name "Beeton School" is taken from Beeton's Christmas Annual, the magazine in which the character Sherlock Holmes first appeared, and Eton College.

In the show, Sherlock Holmes is a strange but clever pupil who lives in room 221B of Baker House, one of the houses of Beeton School. He sleeps during class and has poor grades, especially in literature, philosophy and astronomy. He is thought by teachers to be a troublemaker, but has brilliant reasoning powers and blows a party horn when he thinks about something.

John H. Watson (pronounced "Watoson" in the Japanese) is a transfer student from Australia to Beeton School and roommate of Holmes (pronounced "Homuzu" in the Japanese). He has a strong sense of justice and writes about their investigations in a notebook called "Watoson memo" (memo by John H. Watson), which is reported to the school paper, the "Strand Wall Poster" (a wall newspaper). Though depressed from a leg injury that made him retire from playing rugby football, he pulls himself together with the case of Jefferson Hope ("The First Adventure") and comes to understand Holmes.

Mrs Hudson (pronounced "Hadoson" in the Japanese) is the housemother of Baker (pronounced "Beika" in the Japanese) House. She is jolly and loves singing and baking cookies. Only she calls Holmes by his first name, Sherlock (pronounced "Sharokku" in the Japanese). As Holmes helps her get out of trouble in "The First Adventure," she comes to take a motherly interest in Holmes and Watson.

James Moriarty (pronounced "Jeimuzu Moriati" in the Japanese) is a tall and blond deputy headmaster of the Beeton who has two different aspects:  the right half of his face looks calm, but the other half looks severe. He manages the school and is strict with the pupils, especially Holmes, who always behaves at his own pace.

Mycroft Holmes (pronounced "Maikurofuto" in the Japanese) is a sixth former of Dealer House, elder brother of Sherlock and a founder of the Diogenes Club in the house.

Irene Adler is a school nurse who is having an affair with Headmaster Ormstein but takes up with art teacher Godfrey Norton. Her elegance and sweetness charm male teachers and pupils. She comes to assist the investigations of Holmes and sometimes snaps her fingers at his nose.

Gordon Lestrade (pronounced "Resutoredo" in the Japanese) is a pupil of Cooper House and has an atmosphere of mod subculture. He is a member of the life guidance committee in the school but assists Holmes in investigations that are disfavored by teachers, especially Grimesby Roylott, who is in charge of giving pupils life guidance.

Langdale Pike acts as an informant to Holmes. He is quick at his work but tight with money. He partially plays the role of the Baker Street Irregulars through a group of mice that inform for Holmes.

Sherman, a taxidermist in The Sign of the Four is adapted to a female pupil who loves animals and speaks like a boy. She cooperates with Holmes in his investigations.

Production

Development

Following the broadcast of The Three Musketeers from 2009 to 2010, Kōki Mitani planned to adapt The Brothers Karamazov to a puppetry. Despite his love for the stories of Sherlock Holmes, Mitani was reluctant to adapt the series into puppetry due to the difficulty in describing the details of investigations through the operation of puppets. He also worried that it was too late to produce a Sherlock Holmes series as The Adventures of Sherlock Holmes gained popularity and the modern adaptation Sherlock had already received a reputation. Then he planned to make a puppet with the spitting image of Sherlock Holmes drawn by Sidney Paget but abandoned the idea as tall puppets are difficult for puppeteers to operate. Mitani then decided to make it a show set in a fictional boarding school called "Beeton School" with Sherlock Holmes as a fifteen-year-old schoolboy. Though many incidents occur in the school, there are no murders and the same puppets appear many times.  According to Mitani, as the story progresses it will be revealed to viewers the full picture of why the show is set in a school. All four novels of the canon – A Study in Scarlet, The Sign of the Four, The Hound of the Baskervilles and The Valley of Fear – are dramatised in the puppetry, which Mitani says may be the first case among screen adaptations of Arthur Conan Doyle's work.

At a March 2014 press conference for the show, Mitani said that only real Sherlockians can enjoy the show. Though the comment aroused criticism, he stated that what he wanted to say is that real Sherlockians should have the playfulness of mind to accept and enjoy any adaption of the series of Sherlock Holmes and that the material is worth creating derivative work. He also said that the presence of John Watson as a storyteller is very important and a splendid invention of Arthur Conan Doyle. He describes Watson as having warmth and passion that Holmes lacks and appreciates Martin Freeman who plays Watson with good nature in Sherlock. In 2007, Freeman appeared in the play The Last Laugh, based on University of Laughs (Warai no daigaku) written by Mitani.

Puppets and sets

Mitani has said that what a human plays can also be played by a puppet. The series' puppets are designed by painter Bunta Inoue. He emphasises the cleverness of Holmes by giving the character large ears and broad forehead and made the nose of Holmes characteristic of Holmes in the original. Mitani instructed Inoue on the image of the puppets. For example, the image of Sir Henry Baskerville and Stapleton in the episode based on The Hound of the Baskervilles are modelled on Prince William and Woody Allen, respectively.

Inoue said that he intended to design the puppets to become familiar to children and inspire them to draw doodles. He judged an illustration contest of this show and The Three Musketeers held in Edogawa Ward, Tokyo in September 2014. 
The faces of the puppets are basically expressionless and directed by lighting as is done in Noh and Bunraku. The hair of male puppets is painted as colourful as a merry-go-round while shibori dying techniques are used for that of female puppets.

As the show is produced in Japan, washi paper is frequently used in set construction and properties, including bags, tea sets and lanterns lit by LED lamp. Washi is also used for trees and interiors along with cheesecloth and nonwoven fabric to make the atmosphere natural and warm. Nonwoven fabric also has the advantage of never causing halation in the shooting. The appearance of the set is similar to that of a dollhouse and the cloister is modelled on that of an abbey in Cotswolds. The staff referred to the stained glass in the Sherlock Holmes Museum and the building of St Pancras station in constructing the set.

Beeton School has four houses and each of them has its colour such as dark red for Archer, dark blue for Baker, green for Cooper and grey for Dealer. These colours are adopted in the uniforms of pupils. Holmes wears the dark blue of Baker and hangs a clock and a pair of compasses on his left chest but Watson wears the pale brown uniform of his former school. In Inoue's original sketch, Holmes has a cane whose top is shaped like a skull and the letters of "Sherlock Holmes" are written on each of his shoe soles using the stick figures in "The Adventure of the Dancing Men".

Voice acting
On selecting voice actors, Mitani asked experienced voice actor Koichi Yamadera to voice Holmes, knowing that acting ability was needed to portray the difficult character. Mitani admires Yamadera for he acts the role as if he were a boy who is naive and sensitive, though he is not so in reality.

Like The Three Musketeers, some voice actors play multiple roles in the show. Masashi Ebara voices Jim Moriarty, Godfrey Norton, Aloysius Garcia and Barnicot; and Yuko Sanpei voices Enoch Drebber, Helen Stoner and Henderson.

In "The Adventure of the Cheerful Four", actors Masachika Ichimura and Kenji Urai, who are famous for their appearance in musical theatre, voice some puppets.

Music and the opening theme
Kana Hiramatsu, a member of Spanish Connection is in charge of music. Nano, a singer who also likes the series Sherlock Holmes, performed and wrote the lyrics of the opening theme, "Scarlet Story", that deal with A Study in Scarlet. Nano tries to express the inner pains of Holmes who always searches for the truth.

The show is produced by using prescoring, and projection mapping is used in the title sequence that describes "The Adventure of the Dancing Men".

Playfulness
As well as Mitani's other works, playfulness is included in the show. For example, the episode based on The Sign of the Four is adapted into a musical play; each speckle on a snake that appears in "The Adventure of the Speckled Band" has the shape of crocus, the flower Holmes mentions in the original. Besides Holmes's violin is on the shelf for personal belongings near his bed. Some words and conversation in the series seem to reference the series, Sherlock.

Cast

Main characters
Kōichi Yamadera as Sherlock Holmes 
Wataru Takagi as John H. Watson 
Keiko Horiuchi as Mrs Hudson 
Masashi Ebara as James Moriarty
Rie Miyazawa as Irene Adler
Daisuke Kishio as Gordon Lestrade
Tomokazu Seki as Langdale Pike 
Kami Hiraiwa as Sherman

Other pupils

Archer House pupils
Fuminori Komatsu as Abdullah, a pupil from India and roommate of Arthur Morstan
Masashi Ebara as Aloysius Garcia, who goes missing in "The Adventure of the Serious Witness" 
Yuko Sanpei as Henderson, a roommate of Garcia who also goes missing
Satoshi Tsumabuki as Jefferson Hope, who takes revenge on Drebber and Stangerson in "The First adventure"
Keiko Toda as Isadora Klein, a female juvenile gang leader of Beeton School
Kenji Urai as Arthur Morstan, who forms a chorus band "The Treasures" with the Sholto twins
Anna Ishibashi as Mary Morstan, younger sister of Arthur Morstan, she becomes a love interest for Watson
Daisuke Kishio as Stamford, a model pupil
Sosuke Ikematsu as Jack Stapleton, a childhood friend of Mary Morstan who likes excavating fossils and harasses Mary's boyfriends

Baker House pupils
Atsuko Takaizumi as Agatha, who is tutored privately by Charles Augustus Milverton
Zen Kajihara as Beppo, who destroys plaster works in "The First Adventure" and requests Holmes to solve his trouble in "The Adventure of the Portrait of a Teacher"
Shinji Takeda as Duncan Ross, who invites Jabez Wilson to enter the Red-Headed Club

Cooper House pupils
Masashi Ebara as Barnicot, one of the editors of the school newspaper
Yōsuke Asari as Baynes, who provokes Holmes in "The Adventure of the Serious Witness"
Fuminori Komatsu as Jabez Wilson, a red-headed pupil
Tatsuya Fujiwara as James Windibank, one Mary Sutherland's childhood friends who pretends to be Hosmar Angel

Dealer House pupils
Tomohiko Imai as Henry Baskerville, who witnesses a fearful "Monster Dog" in the back of Beeton School
Yuko Sanpei as Enoch Drebber, a delinquent pupil who is always with Joseph Stangerson
Kōichi Yamadera as Mycroft Holmes, elder brother of Sherlock and head of the pupil council
Masanori Ishii as Wilson Kemp, who kidnaps Sherman in "The Adventure of the Dog's Language Interpreter"
Hiromasa Taguchi as Bartholomew and Theddaus Sholto, twin members of "The Treasures"
Daisuke Kishio as Joseph Stangerson, a friend of Enoch Drebber
Catherine Seto as Mary Sutherland, who requests Holmes to find Hosmar Angel in "The Adventure of the Missing Boyfriend"

Teachers and school staff
Yasunoti Danda as Charles Augustus Milverton, a history teacher
Masashi Ebara as Godfrey Norton, an art teacher
Baijaku Nakamura as Headmaster Ormstein 
Kazuyuki Asano as Grimesby Roylott, who teaches chemistry and gives pupils life guidance
Yuko Sanpei as Helen Stoner, a trainee teacher of chemistry

Other characters
Masachika Ichimura as Jonathan Small, a mailman who is a member of "The Treasures" and attacks other members in "The Adventure of the Cheerful Four"
Kōki Mitani as Mr. Douglas, an American who lives behind Beeton School, appearing in "The Adventure of the Residence of Mr. Douglas"
Yasuko Fujino as Mrs. Douglas, who is suspected by Watson for the murder of her husband
Takahiko Sakoda as Inspector MacDonald, who investigates the murder of Mr. Douglas

Animals
Toby and Sophy, the dogs kept by Sherman
Baker House Irregulars, a group of mice corresponding to the Baker Street Irregulars in the original.
Most of the animals in the show are voiced by Kōichi Yamadera.

Episode list

Series 1

Episodes 5 and 6 were to be broadcast on 20 and 22 August 2014 by GTV, but the schedule was revised because of the broadcast about the landslide in Hiroshima that occurred on 20 August. "The Adventure of the Speckled Band" is the sixth episode broadcast by GTV; ETV broadcast it as episode 11.

In "The Adventure of the Cheerful Four", the original is adapted to a musical. The songs "Golden Slumbers (cradle song)", "Greensleeves" and "Agra Treasure" (an original work for the show) are sung and Toccata and Fugue in D minor, BWV 565 is used in it. The words: "Where does a wise man hide a leaf? In the forest." are a quote from "The Innocence of Father Brown".

A Room of Mystery (Misteri no heya)

This is a spin-off of the series broadcast by NHK Educational TV and NTT's Hikari TV from July to September 2015.  In it, an episode of the first series is played followed by a quiz programme presented by puppetry characters John H. Watson, Lestrade and Langdale Pike.

Related programmes

Special programmes
Special programme  (Let's search "Sherlock Holmes" thoroughly!) was broadcast on 5 October 2014 by NHK Educational TV, promoting the series one week before its ETV debut. In the programme, stage actor and YouTube personality Koji Seto reports on how the puppet show is made, interviews the puppeteers and interviews Holmesians at a cosplay event of Sherlock Holmes in Leeds, at the Sherlock Holmes Museum and at Sherlock Holmes Pub in London, and their reactions to the show are introduced.

In July 2015, there was a promotional programme for "A Room of Mystery" based on some related programmes, adding interviews of Wataru Takagi who voices John H. Watson.

Sherlock Holmes Award
Another special programme "Sherlock Holmes Award" was broadcast on 28 December 2014, while the original series was on a new-year's break. It was presented by Kōichi Yamadera and constituted an awards ceremony, interviews with Kana Hiramatsu, Daniel Harding, Nano and Bunta Inoue and a preview of upcoming episodes.

Mystery Quiz "Sherloc-Q!"
A brief segment produced with the cooperation of Japan Sherlock Holmes Club and navigated by animated Holmes and Watson. It was broadcast after the main part of an episode and gives viewers a quiz with three multiple choices.

Studio Park kara konnnichiwa
Kōichi Yamadera appeared in NHK's show "Studio Park kara konnnichiwa" on 13 November 2014 and talked about why he became a voice actor and played the role of Sherlock Holmes. He also interpreted a silent film by Charles Chaplin.

Events
From 30 November to 28 December 2014, an exhibition of puppets and sets was held at Studio Park in NHK Broadcasting Center, Tokyo, including a workshop for operating puppets. On the last day of the event, Wataru Takagi, who voices John H. Watson, happened to join the workshop.

Bunta Inoue exhibited some puppets from Sherlock Holmes in Art Fair Tokyo held 20–22 March 2015. Besides puppets including the ones newly made are displayed in some areas as Yokohama or Kyoto in 2015. From July to September 2015, an exhibition of the puppets was held in Yokohama. Another exhibition called "Nippon Daaisuki Ten" is scheduled at Happoen, Tokyo from 23 to 29 August 2015.

Media

DVDs
DVDs of the show are released by Pony Canyon.
Vol.1 (Episodes 1–3) released on 16 July 2014 
Vol.2 (Episodes 4–6) released on 19 November 2014
Vol.3 (Episodes 7–9) released on 17 December 2014
Vol.4 (Episode 10, 12 and 13) released on 21 January 2015
Vol.5 (Episode 11, 14 and 15) released on 18 February 2015
Vol.6 (Episodes 16–18) released on 18 March 2015

A Blu-ray disc box set was released on 18 March 2015, with eighteen episodes and bonus footage on three discs.

CD
A soundtrack CD was released on 16 February 2015. Nano's album Rock on in which "Scarlet Story" is recorded was released on 28 January 2015.

Novelisation
The novelisations of the series are published by Shueisha.
() on 14 April 2014.
() on 5 September 2014.
() on 5 January 2015.
() on 5 February 2015.

Guidebook
A guidebook that provides the information of the programme (Shârokku Hômuzu Boken Fan Bukku) was published by Shogakukan on 4 October 2014. 
A Memorial Book that summarises eighteen episodes (Shârokku Hômuzu Kanzen Memoriaru Bukku) was published by Shogakukan on 26 February 2015.

Other merchandising
A quizbook (NHK Shārokku Hōmuzu suiri kuizu bukku) was published by Shufu to seikatsu sha on 21 November 2014. .  Though the book targets the young, it is written by professional mystery writers including Naohiko Kitahara, a member of the Japan Sherlock Holmes Club. It can be called a kind of pastiche for it is not based on the Canon of Sherlock Holmes.

Model figures of Holmes, Watson and Irene Adler were released by De Agostini Japan on 9 October 2014.

Goods related to the programme such as T-shirts, cellular phone cases, tote bags and mugs are sold on the website of SUZURI.

See also
Sherlock Holmes
Canon of Sherlock Holmes
The Three Musketeers (puppetry)
Sherlock Hound

References

Bibliography
Shinjiro Okazaki and Kenichi Fujita (ed.), " Shārokku Hōmuzu Bōken Fan Bukku", Tokyo: Shogakukan, 2014. 
Shinjiro Okazaki and Kenichi Fujita (ed.), ",Shârokku Hômuzu Kanzen Memoriaru Bukku", Tokyo: Shogakukan, 2015.

External links
Introducing NHK's Sherlock Gakuen | ARAMA! JAPAN
Japanese TV series with soundtruck by the MCO: MCO (An article on the music of the Mahler Sound Orchestra)
On Koki Mitani's puppet entertainment (Sherlock Holmes) | NHK Corporate Information
 (Japanese, NHK official website with videos of the show)
 ("Sherlock Gakuen", Japanese)
『NHKパペットエンターテインメント　シャーロックホームズ展』探訪の記 (An article on the exhibition of Sherlock Holmes at NHK Broadcasting Center of the official blog of Japan Sherlock Holmes Club, Japanese)

Sherlock Holmes television series
Japanese television shows featuring puppetry
Japanese children's television series
2014 Japanese television series debuts
NHK original programming
Television shows written by Kôki Mitani